Camera Thrills is a 1935 American short film produced by Charles E. Ford. It was nominated for an Academy Award at the 8th Academy Awards in 1936 for Best Short Subject (Novelty). The Academy Film Archive preserved Camera Thrills in 2012.

References

External links

1935 films
1935 short films
Universal Pictures short films
American black-and-white films
1930s English-language films